Duncan Zgambo (born November 4, 1990), professionally known as Gwamba, is a Malawi-born Rapper and Philanthropist.

Early life
Gwamba is the youngest of four siblings. He spent most of his childhood in area 18, Lilongwe. In 2005 he and 3 friends formed a rap grouped called the Pittie Boys, before he started his solo career in 2009.

Music career
Gwamba's rap career was inspired by US rapper 50 Cent and local musician The Basement. He released a single with the Pittie Boiz called "Work That Thing" , which got airplay on FM 101 radio's Gowelo Beatz in 2008. Gwamba started recording as a solo artist 2009 and has made singles such as "Mmesa", "Tikakumane Kumadzi", "Sindingasiye Bawa", "Carina ya Mdala". In 2013 Gwamba released 3 singles: "Ndi Ofewa featuring EMM Q, Bola Kusache featuring Nesnes and Ndiyima Pachulu Featuring Bucci". Ndiyima pachulu Music video was released in February 2014. A songwriter, Gwamba's lyrics are inspired by real life and being around good people. He has worked with local hip-hop acts such as BarryOne, Young Kay, Phyzix and dancehall star Blak jak. Gwamba now a Gospel artist has released a number of singles such as "Better" and "Alleluyah" both featuring Emm Q and "Nzeru" featuring Maskal. In 2015 he won the award for Artist of The Year at the Urban Music People (UMP Awards), he also won 3 awards at the 2017 UMP awards, 1 award at the 2017 Nyasa music awards, 1 Award at the 2018 UMP Awards.

In 2016, he released his debut album titled Jesus Is My Boss.
Gwamba has since released The true independence.

In 2022, he was featured in a song "Mundikumbuse" by Ritta, award winning malawian female afro singer.

Philanthropy
In 2019: Gwamba became the CEO for Shepherd Bushiri Foundation, a humanitarian organization that was founded by Dr Shepherd Bushiri. Apart from being the CEO for SBF, he has his own charity programs, notable ones including the 2016 1 Million Kwacha Jesus is My Boss Football and Netball Trophy in area 18, 2017 2 Million Kwacha Football and Netball Trophy in area 18, 2017 1 Million Kwacha football and Netball trophy in Ntcheu, a donation of 500,000 Kwacha at Pashello charitable trust in Chikwawa in 2016, a donation of 2 million Kwacha to Pashello charitable trust in 2018, a donation of 3 Million Kwacha of Pashello charitable trust in 2019.

References

External links
Gwamba steals show at star-studded Independence Day Ufulu Festival***
Gwamba, Nesnes, Chambiecco speak on MUMA awards nominations
Ritta featuring Gwamba "Mundikumbutse"

1990 births
Living people
21st-century rappers
21st-century Malawian male singers